= Lead (curling) =

Position in curling

Curling positions
Skip
Third
Second
Lead

In curling, the lead is the person who delivers the first two stones of the end for their team. On most teams, where the lead does not act as skip or vice, the lead will sweep for each of their teammates' shots. Because of the free-guard-zone rule, which prevents leads from removing most of an opponent's guards, leads are usually proficient at throwing guards and draws, and throw few takeouts or other power shots. In some regions, such as Eastern Ontario and the Eastern United States, the lead is responsible for determining who has hammer, using random selection, such as flipping a coin. However, in most regions, this is the responsibility of the third.
